Dandelion was a French psychedelic folk band.

In 1976, Jean Christophe Graf and Serge Cuenot (a future member of the French progressive rock band Ange) formed the band Ode. This band split up after two gigs and Graf formed Dandelion in 1979 in the French town of Belfort. It consisted of Graf (guitars, bass guitar and voice), Thierry Weibel (drums and percussion), and Olivier Richardot (keyboards).

Their first album, Dandelion, was released in 1979 on the label Le Kiosque D'Orphée and recorded at the Cultural Center in Giromagny with a minimal budget. The album has been reissued by the Spanish reissue label Guerssen.

By the 1980s, Dandelion decided to update their musical style and started playing new wave music, totally different from the style of their first album. Their second album, L'Amour Et La Haine, was released in 1981.

The group disbanded in 1983.

References

French musical groups
Psychedelic folk groups